Es teler is an Indonesian fruit cocktail. Avocado, coconut meat, grass jelly, jackfruit and other fruits are served with coconut milk, sweetened condensed milk, Pandanus amaryllifolius leaf (normally in the form of cocopandan syrup), sugar, and a tiny amount of salt.

This concoction, created by Murniati Widjaja, won a competition to come up with a national drink for Indonesia in 1982.

See also

 Es campur
 Halo-halo
 Cendol
 Ais kacang
 List of fruit dishes

References

Indonesian desserts
Fruit dishes
Foods containing coconut
Street food in Indonesia